Number 23 Basketball Player is a sculpture by Niki de Saint Phalle.

It is from the Black Heroes Series.
It is part of the National Museum of Women in the Arts,  New York Avenue Sculpture Project.

Reviews

Jacqueline Trescott (2010). "National Museum of Women in the Arts to turn D.C. corridor into sculpture alley". Style. The Washington Post.  Retrieved 8 Feb 2011.
Blake Gopnik (2010). "Sculptures add color to New York Avenue, but are they art?". Style. The Washington Post. Retrieved 8 Feb 2011.

See also
 List of public art in Washington, D.C., Ward 2

References

External links
NMWAs New York Avenue Sculpture Project Website
Amherst College Digital Collection
https://www.flickr.com/photos/mpcevat/2363890072/

Outdoor sculptures in Washington, D.C.
Artworks in the collection of the National Museum of Women in the Arts
2000 sculptures
Fiberglass sculptures in Washington, D.C.